Jungledyret Hugo is a Danish media franchise featuring the cartoon adventures of a little primate named Hugo. It was created by Danish author and filmmaker Flemming Quist Møller from a lullaby he made for his son, and later evolved into a full-length animated feature, produced at A. Film A/S. The franchise currently consists of two traditionally animated features, an animated television series, books, music album, and a third film animated in CGI.

The first two films were translated, edited, and released in the United States on a single DVD in 1998 by Miramax Family. The first movie was released as Go Hugo Go and the second movie was released as Hugo the Movie Star. The third film was released on region 1 DVD on August 12, 2014 under the title "Amazon Jack".  A CD-ROM side-scrolling platform game for the PC based on the first movie was also made in 1995 and released in Scandinavia.

Different languages 
The original films are known in various locals under different translated names:
 Jungledyret Hugo in Denmark
 Jungeldyret in Norway
 Jungle Jack in France, Netherlands and other countries
 Skógardýrið Húgó in Iceland
 おいらフーゴだ (Oira Fūgoda) in Japan
 Jungle Jack in Czech Republic
 Jack Iz Džungle in Serbia
 Jura Iz Džungle in Croatia
 Dzhungliloom Hugo in Estonia
 Milý Jack in Slovakia
 Viidakkovekara Juuso in Finland
 Hugo das Dschungeltier in Germany
 Dzsungel Jack in Hungary
 Hugo ή Ζούνκλα τον Ζον (Hugo i Zoúnkla ton Zóon) in Greece
 Djungeldjuret Hugo in Sweden
 Szalony Jack in Poland
 La grande avventura di Jungle Jack in Italy
 Jack, Rey del Amazonas in Spain and Mexico
 Hugo, o tesouro da Amazônia in Brazil
 Em Directo da Selva in Portugal
 Hugo the Jungle Animal in Australia, United Kingdom and United States of America

Films

Jungledyret Hugo (1993) 
A musical comedy, the first film in the series. It was the first film in Denmark to pioneer the use of CGI backgrounds and digital ink and paint software and costed around 17 million DKK to make. 150 cartoonists were signed on to work on the film for a year.

This film introduces us to Hugo, an apparently one-of-a-kind animal who lives in a jungle. Youthful and carefree, Hugo is prone to playing practical jokes on his friends, Zig and Zag the monkeys. His idyllic lifestyle is interrupted when he is captured by the CEO of a famed movie company, Conrad Cupmann, to be co-star in a Hollywood-style film. In order to return from Copenhagen to his jungle home, he must escape with the help of a newly found friend, Rita the fox.

Miramax Films in partnership with Cinar produced an English dub of the movie titled Go Hugo Go, which featured actor Bronson Pinchot as Hugo. Despite the dub having a 1998 copyright, it was not released until 2005 when it was released straight-to-DVD with its sequel. Echo Bridge Home Entertainment under license from Miramax released the film on DVD separate from its sequel in 2011.

Jungledyret Hugo 2 – den store filmhelt (1996) 
Still a musical, but more of a drama than the first film, with themes of friendship and loyalty.

The sequel  picks up where the first movie left off. Hugo and Rita each tell their friends about how much they miss one another. Meanwhile, the CEO of the movie studio still wants to catch him. His plan is to have Hugo co-star in a film, and then earn much money through merchandising.

The English version titled this film Hugo the Movie Star (or Hugo 2: The Movie Star), an almost literal translation of the Danish title. A montage of the first film was put during Rita's song at the beginning of the film. Two TV networks, TV2, in Denmark, and YLE in Finland, collaborated to make this film. Unlike the 1st film which was done with traditional ink and painted cels, Jungledyret 2 was digitally inked and painted using Toonz with some of the CGI elements being created in Softimage. The film cost $25 million DKK to make.

Jungledyret Hugo 3 – fræk, flabet og fri (2007) 
The third film continues where the animated series left off, which in turn is a sequel to the second movie. It is a CGI film. The plot again involves Hugo being captured, this time by several competing groups of humans, who are all after Hugo for their own reasons. It was co-produced at Asta Film, Nordisk Film, and A. Film A/S studios in Latvia. The film was made on a budget of €3,400,000. It was later released in the United States by Phase 4 Films in 2014 under the title Amazon Jack.

Books

På eventyr med Rita 
Hugo and Rita, the jungle animals, are tired of being on the film set. They'd rather go into the jungle and find Hugo's two friends, the monkeys Zik and Zak. They run away together, but finding their way to the jungle proves difficult. It doesn't get any easier when they are caught by a family of wrestlers who want to ransom them. Will the two friends ever make it to the jungle?

På farten igen 
Hugo the jungle animal is back in his beloved jungle, and he has his best friend, Rita the fox girl, with him.
Although they have a great time with the monkeys, Zik and Zak, and the other friends in the forest, Hugo will soon need all his courage and ingenuity, because the jaguar is on the loose in their part of the jungle, and Rita can't climb trees...
But the ferocious predators aren't the only danger lurking: Hugo can never be safe when humans are around, after all, he's the world's rarest animal and many people want to get their hands on him. And what do the two bad guys who come sailing down the river in search of the Indians' gold want?

I nordLysets Land 
As always, there are people after Hugo the jungle beast. They want to catch him because he's the rarest animal in the world. Luckily, he has his friend Rita the Urban Fox to help him escape, and this time the two friends are even joined by a nisse. He wants to go to the land of the Elf King, which lies far to the north.

Animated series 

In 2002, the franchise was made into an animated TV-series. It follows the adventures of Hugo and Rita, as they search for a home for the two of them, where they can live in peace and away from any humans that are trying to catch Hugo.

It begins where the second movie left off, with Hugo and Rita on the train they jumped on near the end of the second movie. Hugo's plan is to return to his jungle with Rita, promising her they can live in peace there. During their journey, General Maximus, ruler of Junglandia and Hugo's home, hears about Hugo and decides to capture Hugo, whose species is the symbol of Junglandia. Eventually, Hugo and Rita are caught and brought to General Maximus, but the duo manage to escape, and they arrive in the jungle. At first, Rita has a hard time adapting to the life in the jungle and all the predators, but with the help from Hugo and his fellow jungle animals, she decides to "give it a try".

For a time, Hugo and Rita live in the jungle, but as the rainy season comes, Hugo and Rita end up being flushed out of the jungle, and are once again being hunted by General Maximus. Fortunately, Hugo and Rita find Meatball Charlie, and he manages to get them away from the General. Hugo and Rita then stay with Meatball Charlie for a while, while planning their next move. Eventually, they end up working in a circus. There, Hugo and Rita meet a tomte, who promises that in return for Hugo and Rita helping him to the North Pole and the Santa Claus's castle, he will teach them how to be invisible. Rita is sceptical about the tomte's magic, but Hugo convinces her that if they could learn how to be invisible, no one could catch them again.

Eventually, they make it to the North Pole, but Hugo and Rita are left behind in the blizzard, as the tomte leaves. As they fall asleep, Hugo and Rita are once again caught, this time by scientists that believe Hugo is an unknown arctic animal. Thanks to help from Meatball Charlie, Hugo and Rita manage to escape the research facility, and General Maximus, who was once again back on Hugo's track. Meatball Charlie then decides that, in order to keep Hugo safe from people hunting him, he buys a house on an island in the middle of a lake in Denmark where Hugo, Rita, and himself can live in peace and freedom. There, Hugo and Rita chose to stay, with Meatball Charlie acting as their "guardian", up until the third film.

13 episodes of 24 minutes were produced, and originally aired 2002–2003 on TV2, but made reruns from 2003 to 2006.

Episodes 
 1. "Sydover" ("Southwards")
 2. "Kidnappet" ("Kidnapped")
 3. "Barneleg" ("Child's Play")
 4. "Milliardærens legetøj" ("The Billionaire's Toy")
 5. "Jungleånden" ("Jungle Spirit")
 6. "Jungle ballad" ("Jungle Trouble")
 7. "Frikadelle mytteriet" ("Meatball Mutiny")
 8. "Baby Hugo"
 9. "Klovne på farten" ("Clowns on the Go")
 10. "Nordpå" ("Heading North")
 11. "Trolderi" ("Troll Tales")
 12. "Nordlys" ("Northern Light")
 13. "Videnskabens fange" ("The Prisoner of Science")

Characters 
In the Jungledyret series, many animals talk to each other, but humans cannot understand them. This translation convention is also seen in films such as Balto.
 Hugo
Hugo is the only known surviving member of the fictional species, . His parents are never mentioned. He looks like a derivate of a monkey/koala-like creature, with bright yellow fur.

He has prehensile (grasping) hands, each with three fingers and a thumb. He has large, fuzzy ears, and human-like feet with four big pudgy toes, same with his hands. He is bipedal, though he can run in an awkwardly quadrupedal manner for speed. He can use tools such as levers and skateboards, and can outwit the vast majority of the human beings and other animals, such as snakes, cats, pigs, squirrels and even foxes. He is noted for his sly personality, his childish selfishness, his gluttony and his smugness. He eats mostly fruits and loves bananas (though he is omnivorous, as he won't shy away from eating meatballs). His most feared predator of all is, of course, humanity (with the exception of Meatball Charlie).

Hugo was voiced by Jesper Klein in the original Danish release, his singing voice was provided by Mek Pek and Bronson Pinchot in Miramax dub.

 Rita
Rita is a young red fox kit who befriends Hugo on the streets of Copenhagen. She and Hugo quickly become best friends. She is kind, streetwise, spunky, and has a decent amount of common sense—unlike Hugo, who is rather impulsive. She lived with her mother and her two little brothers and one little sister in a den near some railroad tracks, until the second movie, where she gets dragged along for the ride by Hugo, who was escaping from Cupmann and his henchmen. Her father is never mentioned. A romance between Hugo and Rita is hinted in the first movie and later made sexually suggestive in the second movie, but the animated series and third film later minimized this element to the point where it was only mentioned on a few occasions.

In the original Danish production, Rita was voiced by Kaya Brüel in Danish and Holly Gauthier-Frankel in the Miramax dub.

 Meatball Charlie
Charlie is the cook aboard the cargo ship that transports Hugo to Copenhagen. He finds Hugo, who has escaped the cargo hold, and at the end of the voyage, donates him to the city zoo. He appears toward the end of the first film, and is not present in the second. Though, in the animated series, he appears once again, helping Hugo and Rita on numerous occasions, and in the third film, he makes several appearances, nearly coming off as part of the main character cast. Hugo mentions that Meatball Charlie is probably his and Rita's only "human" friend.

In the original Danish production, Meatball Charlie is named Dellekaj (a mixture of "Delle" which is slang for "frikadelle", a special kind of Danish meatball and "Kaj" which is a common Danish name) and was voiced by Jesper Klein who also voices Hugo, and Marcel Jeannin in the Miramax dub.

 Generalissimo Maximillion Maximus
Generalissimo Maximillion Maximus, better known as General Maximus is one of the series' most recurrent major antagonists. He is the ruler of the recently-founded fictional nation Junglandia – the country from where Hugo originates. The symbol of Junglandia is General Maximus' coat of arms, which depicts the same species as Hugo and, since Hugo is the rarest animal in the world, General Maximus is always seeking Hugo, both to have him as a symbol of the nation and in order to gain a world-famous reputation. He has a low moral set, promising a great reward to the ones who gets Hugo, but he will not always keep his promises, either cheating them, or will later break his promises, and displays a ruthless determination in order to capture him.

 Doctor Loongkoffer
Loongkoffer is an animal psychologist hired by Conrad in Jungledyret 2 to tame Hugo; unfortunately, he fails in his endeavor. Making a return in Jungledyret 3, he has turned over a new leaf and wishes to keep Hugo safe. He is disgusted by Professor Strix's idea of cloning Hugo, fearing that Hugo would die in the experiments. His role is reminiscent of Animaniacs' Dr. Otto Scratchansniff, whose job was to civilize the Warner siblings. He was voiced by Arthur Grosser in the Miramax dub. In Danish TV series and third film, his name is Dr. Donald Sturmdrang in original version.

 Professor Strix
Professor Strix is a mad scientist who appears in the last two episodes of the animated series. He is one of two scientists who believe Hugo is an unknown arctic animal. He runs a professional research facility. In the third movie, he makes a comeback and tried to eradicate Hugo, make multiple copies of Hugo and sell them all around the world. He is very heartless, as he was willing to kill Hugo in an effort to make clones of him. In TV series and third movie, his name is  Professor Strict.

 Sharpclaw
He is a villainous jaguar from the TV series and third film.

 Pedro
He is the bodyguard of General Maximus from TV series and third film.

Films 
 Conrad Cupmann
Conrad owns a movie studio in Copenhagen, and dreams of making much money. He is morally bankrupt, willing to slash and burn the jungle to capture Hugo. His first relationship started off with Izabella Dehavalot, but he rejected her wishes and left her when Hugo manages to escape Copenhagen in the first film. His second relationship is with Barbie Turner, but instead, he is rejected by her, since she did not want him hurting Hugo. He is voiced by Flemming Quist Møller in Danish and Mark Camacho in the Miramax dub.

 Izabella Dehavalot
Izabella is a black-haired starlet with a sharp figure. She is also the ex-wife of Conrad Cupmann. Her goal is to gain notoriety through the exploitation of an animal co-star; she cites several fictional actors, and then her "good friend Michael" and his chimp. Upon the discovery of Hugo, Izabella brightens at the idea of using him as her co-star and stops at nothing to capture him. Conrad divorced her in the time span between the two films, after she becomes obsessed to the point of madness over capturing Hugo. In all European versions, she is called Izabella Scorpio. She was voiced by Jytte Abildstrøm in Danish and Susan Glover in the Miramax dub.

 Rita's Mother
Rita's mother is a city fox living in Copenhagen. Rita first mentions her to Hugo during their encounter at the zoo, explaining that she hunts food for the family during the night, although it seems she rarely finds enough, as Rita says she is always hungry. Rita describes her as "real tough" and implies she has regularly fought and killed the city's stray cats. The hunt leaves her exhausted, and she spends most of the daytime in the den. She strongly disapproves of Rita's nighttime adventures, but can do little to dissuade her. Experienced but somewhat cold, she initially refuses to harbor Hugo when Rita brings him home, stating that the den is already crowded, but Rita's pleading leads her to relent, and she lets him stay for the day. She catches the two before they set off for the banana ship that evening, offering to take Hugo to the docks herself and ordering Rita to stay and look after her siblings. As they enter the industrial park they are pursued by one of the bounty hunters; fearing for her own safety, she abandons Hugo before they reach the harbor, giving him vague directions before fleeing the area. Rita's mother makes two brief appearances in Jungledyret 2. She doubts Hugo will ever return to Copenhagen and tells Rita to forget about him, while she goes out to hunt for food. She is not referenced in later media. She was voiced by Helle Ryslinge in Danish and Sonja Ball in Miramax dub.

 Barbie Turner
Barbie is a stereotypical dumb blonde and, in the second film, is Cupmann Studio's new starlet. It is also implied that she is Conrad's lover. She often chews bubble gum, even on the sound stage. In the original version of the movie, her name is Sensuella. She was voiced by Louise Fribo in the Danish dub and Jennifer Seguin in the Miramax dub.

 The Jungle Dog
The Jungle Dog is a small jungle bush dog pup that Hugo and Rita encounter in the third movie. Rita discovers the pup when she hides in a hollow log near the Jungle Dog's nest area. The pup mistakes Rita for its mother, and Rita (presuming the pup was abandoned by its real mother) takes it under her wing. Before the movie's release, some fans mistook the pup to be Hugo and Rita's child.

Television series 
 Carlton and Heath
Carlton and Heath are the two reporters to catch Hugo and Rita.

 Gangsters
A quartet of gangsters, whose names are Bonnie, Sonny, Tonny, and Johnny.

 Ramon and Jeff
They are two hunters from the jungle who keep trying to catch Hugo.

 Oleta the Otter
She is a giant otter from the TV series.

 Carla
She is a sister of Meatball Charlie from TV series.

 Wilhelm Croesus
He is a wealthy man, grandfather of Georgia Croesus.

Books 
 Funny Bonito
He is the leader of the gangster.
 Ronny
He is the gangster and the twin of Tonny.
 Mikkel
He is a Mountain fox from I nordLysets Land.

Changes in the Miramax Dub 
The films have some content which might be considered unsuitable by United States viewers, considering the films are mainly directed to children. Because of this, Miramax made several edits and cuts when dubbing the films to English.

In the first film, when Hugo is sleeping on a ship, a calendar above him displays a picture of a naked woman. The image was blurred in the Miramax dub. A scene where Hugo is shocked three times by telephone wires and climbs up a brick wall to find, through a window, a man changing channels on a television was cut from the dub. Another scene where Rita spits at the floor where Hugo is standing as a sign of displeasure was also cut. The dub also toned down the original's language and removed some of Izabella's racial remarks about an Indian character, Izabella bits her arm was cut from the dub. And the scene near the end of the film when Izabella becomes insane with her obsession was cut.

In the second film, most edits were limited to dialogue alterations, but two scenes where Conrad is seen grabbing the buttocks of Sensuella/Barbie Turner were cut. Also, apparently for time, a scene where Hugo and Rita are on a train after escaping from Conrad's henchmen and guard dogs was shortened; in the original Hugo hugs Rita before the screen goes to black due to a scene change, but in the English dub the screen goes to black before Hugo hugs Rita.

Also, the music for both films was heavily redone in the English dub, mainly replacing dramatic instrumental or jazz-based music from the original films with more upbeat and friendly melodies. The score in the English version was composed by Jack Maeby, who had contributed to other Miramax dubs at the time.

References 

10. https://www.amazon.com.au/Amazon-Jack-DVD-Anders-Sorensen/dp/B01DRYS8E0 (in Australia)

External links 
 
 
 A Film, home studio of Jungledyret Hugo
 Flemming Quist Møller Director and head writer

1990s children's animated films
1993 films
1996 films
2002 Danish television series debuts
2002 Danish television series endings
2007 films
Animated film series
Danish animated films
Danish children's television series
Danish-language films
Film series introduced in 1993
Films based on Danish novels
Miramax animated films
1990s American films
2000s American films